Giovanni Battisti de Lisulis (died 1548) was a Roman Catholic prelate who served as Bishop of Guardialfiera (1543–1548).

Biography
On 16 February 1543, Giovanni Battisti de Lisulis was appointed by Pope Paul III as Bishop of Guardialfiera. He served as Bishop of Guardialfiera until his death in 1548.

References

External links and additional sources
 (for Chronology of Bishops) 
 (for Chronology of Bishops) 

16th-century Italian Roman Catholic bishops
1548 deaths
Bishops appointed by Pope Paul III